Iringole Kavu is a forest temple dedicated to Goddess Durga, situated in Kunnathunad Taluk of Ernakulam district, 2.5 km from Perumbavoor. This is one of the 108 Durga Temples in Kerala believed to have been consecrated by Lord Parasurama, the sixth avatar of Lord Vishnu.

Location

This temple is located in the village 'Pattal' 35 kilometers away from Kochi, 8 kilometres away from Perumbavoor, and 20 kilometres away from Kothamangalam

Near iringole kavu there is a school called Government Vocational Higher Secondary School also called "Iringole School" by residents of Iringole. There's a "mana", which is nearer to the temple, that is a historical place. Now it is kept as a tourist spot.

Mythology

See also Devaki

Kansa imprisoned Devaki and Vasudevar due to the fear that their eighth son Krishna who is to be born soon would be his terminator from the earth. In fear and fury Kansa decided to kill their all sons. Vasudevar planned to save his eighth son from the danger at any cost. The parents shifted baby Krishna to Vrindavan soon after he was born and placed another girl baby (an incarnation of the goddess Yoga-Nidra or Maya) in the cradle. Kansa decided to kill the girl baby too, despite realising she was not the eight son of Vasudevar. He lifted the baby furiously above his head, but miraculously the baby became a supernatural power and remained in the atmosphere as 'IRRINNOLE'. Later this area was named as IRINGOLE. It is believed that the gods and goddesses surrounded the power in the forms of trees and plants. And later it is developed into a beautiful thick forest. It is owned by Naganchery Mana.now run by Travancore Devaswom.

Naganchery Mana

'Iringole Mana' or 'Nagancherry Mana' of Perumbavoor was one  old janmi family of Kerala.
102-year-old Vasudevan Namboothiri, the current 'karanavar' of the 'mana'.From owning over 15,000 hectares of land in places ranging from Aluva to Thiruvananthapuram five decades ago, the 'karanavar' was forced to sell the 'mana' for a measly Rs 1 lakh to Perumbavoor municipality in 1980.
The bedridden 'desadhikari' now lives with his younger son Ganapathy in a rented house, once owned by him, at Valakkara near Perumbavoor with not an inch of land to lay claim to.
The new secretariat building in Thiruvananthapuram had come up on land once owned by the 'mana', once the head of 18 'desams' spread from Aluva to Thiruvananthapuram.
'Iringole Kavu', adjacent to the 'mana', is now run by Travancore Devaswom.

Iringol Kavu Images

Iringol Kavu

Iringol Kavu Temple ( Naganchery Mana )

External links 

iringolekavu attractions ( Essential Informations to Travel )

References

Hindu temples in Ernakulam district
Durga temples
Devi temples in Kerala